The Cybersecurity and Infrastructure Security Agency Act of 2018 was signed by president Donald Trump  on November16, 2018 to create the Cybersecurity and Infrastructure Security Agency under the Department of Homeland Security.

References

External links 
 H.R. 3359, at Congress.gov

Acts of the 115th United States Congress
Computer law
United States Department of Homeland Security